The 2013 CWHL Draft was held in August 2013. Jessica Wong became the first visible minority selected with the first pick overall. Wong was also part of another unique piece of draft history. Her teammate from the Minnesota-Duluth Bulldogs, Katie Wilson, was picked second overall. It marked the first time that two NCAA teammates were selected first and second overall.
 
In addition, Blake Bolden became the first ever African American picked in the first round of said draft. Georgia Moore, a member of the Australian national women's team became the first Australian born player selected in the draft. Along with Julie Paetsch, both had experience competing in women's tackle football in the Western Women's Canadian Football League. Moore spent one season with the Okotoks Lady Outlaws, while Paetsch enjoyed multiple seasons with the Saskatoon Valkyries. It marked the first time that two WWCFL players were selected in the CWHL Draft. Of note, Delayne Brian was the first goaltender selected in the draft.

Top 25 picks

Draft picks by team

Calgary

Boston

Brampton

Montreal

Toronto

References

2013 CWHL Draft
Draft